MODS may refer to:

 Metadata Object Description Schema, a bibliographic description schema
 Microscopic Observation Drug Susceptibility assay
 Multiple organ dysfunction syndrome
 Microsoft Office Document Scanning
 Military Orbital Development System, created by the US Air Force Space System Division
 Multiplexed Optical Data Storage
 Museum of Discovery and Science, in Fort Lauderdale, Florida, US
 Model Organism Databases, databases that house and disseminate organism-specific biological knowledge

See also 

Mod (disambiguation)

nl:Mods